The Petroleum Act 1868 (31 & 32 Vict c 56) is an Act of the Parliament of the United Kingdom to amend the Petroleum Act 1862 relating to the licensing, storage and sale of petroleum and petroleum products.

Background 
The original Petroleum Act of 1862 was found to be defective. A Parliamentary Committee on Fire Protection had been established in 1867, to 'inquire into the existing legislative provisions for the protection of life and property against fires in the United Kingdom, and as to the best means for ascertaining the causes and preventing the frequency of fires'. Evidence given to the committee indicated that the Petroleum Act 1862 was inoperative; the committee's fourth (of four) recommendation was that the existing law should be amended to correct this deficiency. This was enacted through the provisions of the Act of 1868.

The Petroleum Act 1868 
The Petroleum Act 1868 (31 & 32 Vict. c.  56) received Royal Assent on 18 July 1868. Its provisions came into effect on 1 February 1869.

Provisions 
The Act included the following provisions.

No petroleum shall be kept, other than for private use, within 50 yards of a dwelling house or a building in which goods are stored, except with a licence given by a local authority under the 1862 Act. A licence may specify conditions regarding the mode of storage, the nature of the stored goods, the testing of petroleum, etc.

Petroleum kept in contravention of this provision was forfeit and there was a penalty of £20 for each day it was kept in contravention of the Acts of 1862 and 1868.

A provision was made for the sale of petroleum for illumination. This stated ‘no person shall sell or expose for sale or use within the United Kingdom any petroleum on or after 1 February 1869 which gives off inflammable vapour at a temperature of less than 100 °F unless the bottle or vessel... [has] a label... stating ‘Great care must be taken in bringing any light near to the contents of this vessel , as they give off an inflammable vapour at a temperature of less than 100 degrees... Fahrenheit’’.

For any offence in contravention of this section there was a penalty of £5.

Offences were to be tried by magistrates.

Power was given to Weights and Measures inspectors to test petroleum. A method of testing is described in the Schedule of the Act.

Petroleum is defined as ‘any bituminous substance as fires off an inflammable vapour at a temperature of less than 100 °F’.

Consequential legislation 
The Petroleum Acts of 1862 and 1868 were repealed by the Petroleum Act 1871. However, some of the provisions, such as affixing a label prior to sale, were carried over into the 1871 Act.

See also 
History of fire safety legislation in the United Kingdom
Petroleum Acts

References 

United Kingdom Acts of Parliament 1868
Petroleum industry in the United Kingdom
History of the petroleum industry in the United Kingdom